Eduard Jõepere was an Estonian professional footballer who played as a forward for the Estonian national football team.

Career
Jõepere debuted for the Estonian national team in 1921 in a match against Finland.

References

Estonian footballers
Estonia international footballers
Association football forwards
Year of birth missing
Year of death missing